Tiream is a commune of 2,375 inhabitants situated in Satu Mare County, Romania. It is composed of three villages: Portița (Portelek), Tiream and Vezendiu (Vezend).

Demographics
Ethnic groups (2002 census): 
Romanians: 48.3%
Hungarians: 29.2%
Germans: 14.1%
Roma: 8.1%

According to mother tongue, 50.1% of the population speak Romanian, while 45.6% speak Hungarian as their first language.

References

Communes in Satu Mare County